Oryx, or Oryxspioenkop, is a Dutch open-source intelligence (OSINT) defence analysis website, and warfare research group. It is run by Stijn Mitzer and Joost Oliemans. Both have previously worked for Netherlands-based Bellingcat. Oliemans also worked for Janes Information Services, a British open-source military intelligence company.

Oryx was started in 2013, and initially focused on Syria. Mitzer and Oliemans have also written two books on the Korean People's Army. According to Oryx, the term spionkop (Afrikaans for "spy hill") "refers to a place from where one can watch events unfold around the world".

The blog gained international prominence through its work during the 2022 Russian invasion of Ukraine, counting and keeping track of material losses based on visual evidence and open-source intelligence from social media. It has been regularly cited in major media, including Reuters, BBC News, The Guardian, The Economist, Newsweek, CNN, and CBS News. Forbes has called Oryx "the most reliable source in the conflict so far", calling its services "outstanding". Because it reports only visually confirmed losses, Forbes claimed that Oryx's tallies of equipment losses have formed absolute minimum baselines for loss estimates.

References

External links
 

2013 establishments
Information technology organisations based in the Netherlands
Intelligence websites
Open-source intelligence